The following is a list of Grammy Awards winners and nominees from Mexico:

References

Mexican
 Grammy
Grammy
Grammy